Walter Bruce may refer to:

 Walter Bruce (English footballer) (1915–?), who played for Workington, Bradford City and Swansea Town
 Walter Bruce (Northern Irish footballer) (1938–2015), who played for Glentoran and the Northern Ireland national team
 Walter Bruce (Scottish footballer) (1873–1941), who played for Renton and St Mirren
 Walter Bruce (Constant Moderator) (1605–1673), the only minister of the Church of Scotland to have served a perpetual role as Moderator